Ramsey Run is a 1st order tributary to Brandywine Creek in New Castle County, Delaware.

Course
Ramsey Run rises about 0.5 miles southeast of Beaver Valley, Delaware, and then flows west to join Brandywine Creek about 0.5 miles southwest of Beaver Valley, Delaware.

See also
List of Delaware rivers

References

Rivers of Delaware
Rivers of New Castle County, Delaware
Tributaries of the Christina River